Jean Gabriel Prosper Marie (8 January 1852 – 29 August 1928) was a French romantic composer and conductor.

Biography
Gabriel-Marie was born in Paris, France on 8 January 1852. He studied at the Conservatoire de Paris and held a prominent position in the local musical world. He died unexpectedly on 29 August 1928 in Puigcerdà, Girona, Spain.

He was the father of the composer Jean Gabriel Marie.

Works
Gabriel-Marie's works include La Cinquantaine ("The Golden Wedding", 1887) for cello and piano, for octet, and in various other arrangements. He also composed many dance pieces, notably the waltz Sous les firnes ("Under the Ash Trees", 1884) and the highly original polka Frais minois ("Fresh Face"). Sérénade Badine achieved some popularity by its numerous arrangements, including those for saxophone and piano, and cello and piano, as did other chamber works and light works for orchestra.

 Adagio for violin and piano
 Cassandre, Bouffonnerie
 Chanson Capriceuse for various instrumentations: cello or violin and piano; cello and orchestra
 Chant Pastoral for oboe and piano or orchestra
 En rêve, Esquisse symphonique for orchestra, or piano solo
 Frais minois ("Fresh Face")
 Furtivement, Impression musicale
 Impressions - Six Morceaux pour Violion et and Piano (1894, Schott Frères, Bruxelles)
 Simplicité
 Insouciance
 Quiétude
 Souvenir
 Mélancolie
 Allègresse
 Impromptu-valse for piano
 Intermezzo for various instrumentations: cello or violin and piano; cello and orchestra; piano solo
 La Soixantaine, Chers souvenirs 
 4 Morceaux for Cello and Piano
 Dans le calme du soir, Mélodie 
 Fleur novelle, Romance
 Radotages
 Douce Rencontre
 Pasquinade for various instrumentations: cello (or violin, or viola, or mandolin, or flute, or oboe, or clarinet, or alto saxophone) and piano; cello and orchestra; piano solo; piano 4-hands
 2 Pieces for cello and piano
 Lamento (1887) for various instrumentations: cello (or violin, or viola, or flute, or clarinet) and piano
 La Cinquantaine, Air dans le style ancien ("The Golden Wedding", 1887) for various instrumentations: cello (or violin, or viola, or mandolin, or flute, or oboe, or clarinet, or alto saxophone) and piano; cello and quintet; piano solo; piano 4-hands; organ; harmonium; orchestra; military band; voice and piano; 2 voices and piano
 3 Pieces for cello and piano
 Romance (also for violin and piano)
 Sérénade badine (also for violin, viola, mandolin, flute, oboe, or clarinet and piano)
 Tzigane, Mazurka  (also for violin and piano, cello and orchestra, piano solo, and piano 4-hands)
 Près du Gourbi, Fantaisie arabe
 Renouveau for piano
 Rêverie for various instrumentations: cello (or violin, or viola, or mandolin, or flute, or oboe, or clarinet, or alto saxophone) and piano; cello and orchestra; piano solo; piano 4-hands
 Songe d'enfant for orchestra, or piano solo
 Sous les firnes ("Under the Ash Trees", 1884)
 Sur la route, Marche bohême
 Vieille histoire for various instrumentations: cello or violin and piano; cello and orchestra; chamber orchestra; piano solo; piano 4-hands
 Retraite Croate ("Croatian Retreat")

References

External links
 

1852 births
1928 deaths
French male classical composers
French opera composers
Male opera composers